The anococcygeal nerve is a nerve in the pelvis which provides sensory innervation to the skin over the coccyx. The number of anococcygeal nerves vary between one and three.

Structure

The anococcygeal nerve arises from the coccygeal plexus. It pierces the sacrotuberous ligament to supply the skin in the region of the coccyx as well as the sacrococcygeal joint.

See also
 Coccyx
  Coccydynia (coccyx pain, tailbone pain)
 Ganglion impar
 Sacral plexus

References

External links
Coccyx pain, tailbone pain, coccydynia (Peer-reviewed medical chapter, available free online at eMedicine)

Nerves of the lower limb and lower torso